Vichitra Jeevitham is a 1978 Indian Telugu-language drama film directed by V. Madhusudhana Rao. The film stars Akkineni Nageswara Rao, Vanisri and Jayasudha, with music composed by Chakravarthy. It is a remake of the Hindi film Daag (1973), which itself is based on Thomas Hardy's 1886 novel The Mayor of Casterbridge. The film was released on 14 April 1978.

Plot 
Chandra Shekar "Chandram" loves and marries Gowri. Soon, Chandram gets a job in an estate owned by Surendra Nath a decadent person who behaves like a gentleman and provides good hospitality. Later, once Gowri is alone, tries to molest her but Chandram arrives in time, and the quarrel ensues into the death of Surendra Nath. Chandram is sentenced to death but, on the way to prison, the police van meets with an accident and all occupants are dead. By that time, Gowri is pregnant and gives birth to a baby boy. Years roll by, and Gowri works as a school teacher where she gets acquainted with one of the board members Ganga and they become good friends. Due to the ill-reputation of Gowri's husband, she loses her job when Ganga welcomes Gowri to her house. There, Gowri flabbergasts & stupefies to see Chandram alive as Ganga's husband. So, Gowri decides to quit, Chandram obstructs her when she accuses her of his deed then he narrates the past. After escaping from the accident, Chandram immediately rushed for Gowri but her whereabouts are not known. Thereafter, in the passage, he met Ganga and learns that she has been ditched by her lover despite being pregnant. So, Chandram married her to provide legitimacy to the child, in return for her help in establishing his new identity as Shekar. Right now, Ganga spots the closeness of Shekar with Gowri and suspects them. Later on, realises the truth and requests forgiveness. At present, the law is again at Chandram's doorstep as Inspector Anand with an added crime of bigamy. At last, Ganga brings out the wickedness of Surendra Nath as he is the same one the deceived her and affirms the nobleness of Chandram. Finally, Chandram is acquitted and the movie ends all of them living together, happily.

Cast 
Akkineni Nageswara Rao as Chandra Shekar
Vanisri as Gowri
Jayasudha as Ganga
Mohan Babu as Surendra Nath
Jaggayya as Inspector Anand
Gummadi as Visweswaraiah
Nagabhushanam as Jananatham
Dhulipala as Lawyer
Kakarala as Lawyer
Rama Prabha as Jaganatham's wife
Radha Kumari as Principal
Jaya Malini as item number

Soundtrack 
The music was composed by Chakravarthy.

References

External links 
 

1970s Telugu-language films
1978 drama films
1978 films
Films based on The Mayor of Casterbridge
Films directed by V. Madhusudhana Rao
Films scored by K. Chakravarthy
Indian drama films
Telugu remakes of Hindi films